is a 2008 Japanese animated war film, directed by Mamoru Oshii.  It is an adaptation of Hiroshi Mori's novel of the same name.  It was released across Japanese theatres by Warner Bros. Japan on August 2, 2008.  Animated by Production I.G, the film was written by Chihiro Itō, featuring character designs by Tetsuya Nishio and music by Kenji Kawai. The 3D CG animation for the movie was produced by the Polygon Pictures studio, who also produced the 3D CG for Oshii's previous film Ghost in the Shell 2: Innocence.

Plot

The Sky Crawlers is set in an alternate history timeline where although the world is at peace, in order to ease the tension of a populace accustomed to war and aggression, private corporations contract fighter pilots to engage in actual combat operations against each other. The film introduces characters known as  - humanoids genetically engineered in a way that enables them to live eternally in adolescence.

After the deaths of three pilots of the Rostock Corporation, a fighter pilot, Yūichi Kannami, is reassigned to Area 262. After meeting with Chief Mechanic Towa Sasakura, he inquires as to the fate of the previous pilot of his plane. Kannami meets the base's commanding officer, Suito Kusanagi, who names the previous pilot as Kurita Jinroh, but refuses to say what happened to him. Shortly afterward, he meets the rest of the base's pilots: Aizu Yudagawa, Yuriyuki Shinota and Naofumi Tokino.

Tokino and Kannami embark upon a reconnaissance mission the following day, during which they down three enemy fighters. Later that evening, Tokino and Kannami visit a diner, where they are met by two women named Kusumi and Fuuko - the latter of whom Kannami has sex with. Fuuko informs Kannami that she had a relationship with Jinroh and says that Kannami's existence must mean that Jinroh is no longer alive.

Returning from sortie early, Kannami meets Mizuki Kusanagi, who introduces herself as Suito's younger sister, but Tokino informs him that she is actually Suito's daughter. Discussing the matter with Suito, she wonders what will happen when Mizuki reaches Suito's age, implying that Suito is a Kildren.

A sponsor tour of the base is interrupted by the downing of a friendly plane from a neighbouring area. Arriving on the scene, Kusanagi berates a group of civilian observers for pitying the killed pilot before leaving the scene with Kannami. Later, Kannami visits the diner again, during which he spots enemy bombers and warns the base. Kusanagi sorties the pilots, taking Kannami's plane in his absence. The two visit theatre command, where an officer bars them from meeting with Kusanagi's superior. The two later visit an isolated lodge, which, according to Kusanagi, "no-one visits twice". Kannami asks Kusanagi if she killed Jinroh, to which Kusanagi asks if Kannami "wants to be killed as well".

During a later sortie, Yudagawa and Kannami spot several enemy bombers with fighter escorts. Rushing ahead to engage the enemy alone, Yudagawa is shot down by Teacher, and his plane sinks into the sea. Kusanagi orders all the remaining pilots to sortie to hunt down the Teacher, taking Kannami's plane personally. Tokino and Yuri return without Kusanagi, who rushed off alone after spotting the Teacher. Kannami's crashed plane is later found by Fūko, and the injured Kusanagi is brought back to base for treatment. Fūko reveals that Kusanagi once visited one of her clients, and had sex with him.

The pilots are called out to March-Hare base in preparation for a major operation against an enemy airbase. Tokino and Kannami meet with Midori Mitsuya, March-Hare's ace pilot, who seeks out Kannami, having heard about his reputation. The pilots are briefed on the operation and sortie. Rostock forces suffer heavy losses in the battle, Yuri among them, and are ordered to return to base. Later that evening, Tokino, Kannami and Kusanagi go bowling together. After Tokino leaves, Kannami asks Kusanagi about her relation to the Teacher, to which she replies that the Teacher is her former superior officer. Kusanagi contemplates how the perpetual existence of their war mandates an undefeatable enemy, which exists in the form of the Teacher. Later, a drunken Kusanagi puts a gun to Kannami's head before asking him to kill her, lest "nothing change" for them.

The pilots return to 262, with the pilots from March-hare reinforcing them. Kannami encounters a new pilot, Aihara, who looks and behaves extremely similarly to Yudagawa. Midori visits Kannami, and suffers a nervous breakdown, wondering if she is a Kildren, and realizing that she cannot recall any memories of her childhood. She asserts that Kannami is Jinroh's reincarnation, implanted with Jinroh's memories to maintain his skills as a pilot. Later that evening, Midori tries to shoot Kusanagi. Kannami, woken by the gunshot, intervenes and takes the gun from her. Kusanagi admits to killing Jinroh on his own request, before asking Kannami to shoot her. Kannami refuses, insisting that she must continue to live until she can change things.

The pilots leave on patrol as Kannami contemplates how one can find new experiences even if one has travelled the same path before, and regains his memories as Jinroh. Midori sights the Teacher's plane, which Kannami engages alone, resolving to "kill his father". The two engage in a dogfight and Kannami is killed. One by one, the base personnel accept that Kannami is not coming back.

In a post-credits scene, pilot Isamu Hiragi arrives at 262. His face is not shown, but his physical mannerisms in exiting his plane are identical to Kannami's, as is his voice. Hiragi is greeted by Kusanagi in a much warmer fashion, telling him that she's "been waiting for him to arrive".

Aircraft 

Rostock
 Sanka Mk.B: Standard fighter of Rostock Iron Works.  It resembles the Kyushu J7W Shinden.
 Someaka: A twin engine pusher canard fighter. Cockpit canopy and nose somewhat resemble the Fairchild Republic A-10 Thunderbolt II.
 Senryu: Two-seat radar equipped fighter resembling the Bolton Paul P99 and Junkers Ju 188.
 Whale: Flying boat Tanker Aircraft
 Bomber: Heavy bomber in a flying wing pusher configuration resembling the Northrop XB-35.

Lautern
 Rainbow: Standard fighter of Lautern with two pusher propeller engines. It resembles the blend of Gloster Meteor and Supermarine Spitfire.
 Fortune: A six-engined pusher-prop heavy bomber. Likely modelled after the Victory Bomber.
 Skyly J2: The fighter flown by 'Teacher'.  Its design resembles Hawker Sea Fury but with turbocharged V-16 engine and five cannons. Also referred to as the "J-Zwei," zwei being German for two. Often misheard as J5. 
 Prop 4: This is actually just the shortened term "prop forward." It refers to aircraft with a tractor propeller configuration, such as the Skyly.

Cast

Japanese
 Yūichi Kannami: Ryō Kase
 Suito Kusanagi: Rinko Kikuchi
 Naofumi Tokino: Shōsuke Tanihara
 Midori Mitsuya: Chiaki Kuriyama
 Mizuki Kusanagi: Megumi Yamaguchi
 Aizu Yudagawa: Daisuke Hirakawa
 Uroyuki Shinoda: Takuma Takewaka
 Towa Sasakura: Yoshiko Sakakibara
 Kyoku Yama: Mugihito
 Honda: Hōchū Ōtsuka
 Kusmi: Mako Hyōdō
 Fūko: Mabuki Andō
 Yuri: Yuriko Hishimi
 Bus guide: Yukari Nishio (Nippon TV announcer)
 Master: Naoto Takenaka

English
 Michael Sinterniklaas - Yūichi Kannami
 Stephanie Sheh - Suito Kusanagi
 Troy Baker - Naofumi Tokino
 Bryce Hitchcock - Mizuki Kusanagi
 Doug Erholtz - Aizu Yudagawa, Blond-Haired Children
 Kirsten Potter - Fūko
 Mari Devon - Towa Sasakura
 Paul St. Peter - Mission Briefer

Crew

Japanese
 Director: Mamoru Oshii
 Original Creator: Hiroshi Mori
 Screenplay: Chihiro Itō
 Music: Kenji Kawai
 Executive Producers: Seiji Okuda, Mitsuhisa Ishikawa
 Producer: Tomohiko Ishii
 Sequence Director: Toshihiko Nishikubo
 Character Design and Chief Animation Director: Tetsuya Nishio
 Mechanical Design: Atsushi Takeuchi
 Art Director: Kazuo Nagai
 Art Settings: Takashi Watanabe
 Color Designs: Kumiko Yusa
 Visual Effects: Hisashi Ezura
 CGI Supervisor: Hiroyuki Hayashi
 Sound Director: Kazuhiro Wakabayashi
 Line Producer: Tōru Kawaguchi
 Animation Production: Production I.G
 Production: Sky Crawlers Production Committee (Nippon Television Network Corporation, Production I.G, Bandai Visual, Warner Brothers, D-Rights, VAP, Yomiuri Telecasting Corporation, Hakuhodo DY Media Partners, D.N. Dream Partners, Yomiuri Shimbun, Chūōkōron-shinsha, Hochi Shimbun)
 Distribution: Warner Bros. Japan

Sources:

English
 Ezra Weisz - Voice Director

Production
Author Mori said he felt The Sky Crawlers was the "most difficult" of his works to adapt, and only consented to its filming after learning of Oshii's directorial involvement.

Soundtrack

All music by Kenji Kawai.

 "Main Theme (Opening)"
 "First Sortie"
 "Sail Away (Vocal)"
 "Foo-Ko"
 "Main Theme (Memory)"
 "Mizuki"
 "Surprise Attack"
 "Drive-By-Wire"
 "Main Theme - Affair (Harp)"
 "Main Theme - Blue Fish (Orgel)"
 "Private Sortie"
 "Second Sortie"
 "Night Sortie"
 "March Hare"
 "Adler Tag"
 "Krakow"
 "Main Theme (Affair)"
 "Main Theme (Blue Fish)"
 "Final Sortie"
 "Teacher"
 "Main Theme (Ending)"

The song used in the end credits, "Konya mo Hoshi ni Dakarete", sung by Ayaka, was not included in the soundtrack.

Distribution
The Sky Crawlers was distributed in Japan by Warner Bros. Japan. It was subsequently distributed internationally by Sony Pictures, who initially announced their plans on the film's North American premiere at the 2008 Toronto International Film Festival. They consequently sent this film as their entry for Best Animated Feature at the 81st Academy Awards.

The American release of the film differs from the Japanese release in that the song used during the ending credits of the Japanese version, "Konya mo Hoshi ni Dakarete", by Ayaka, is not used in the American release.

Reception 
The film was an official selection of the 65th Venice International Film Festival, where it won the Future Film Festival Digital Award, and the 2008 Toronto International Film Festival. Later, the film competed officially at the famed Sitges - Catalan International Film Festival, where it won three separate awards: the Jose Luis Guarner Critic Award, Best Original Soundtrack (for Kenji Kawai) and an award given by the Carnet Jove Jury for "the best motion picture for a youth audience." The film was also in the official selection at the Helsinki International Film Festival and Stockholm International Film Festival. The International Press Academy nominated it for the Best Motion Picture. It won Best Animation Film at the 63rd Mainichi Film Awards.

The film received positive reviews from film critics. It holds a 80% approval rating on the review aggregator website Rotten Tomatoes, based on 10 reviews with an average score of 6.86 out of 10. Anime News Network gave the film a B+.

Video game
A tie-in game for and prequel to the film, The Sky Crawlers: Innocent Aces, was released for the Wii in October 2008 in Japan, before being localized for the Western world in early 2010.  Both Mamoru Oshii and Hiroshi Mori were involved in consulting development for the game.

References

External links
  Official website
 
 
 

2008 anime films
2008 films
Animated war films
Anime films based on novels
Dieselpunk films
Films directed by Mamoru Oshii
Nippon TV films
Films scored by Kenji Kawai
Japanese animated science fiction films
Japanese aviation films
2000s Japanese-language films
Production I.G
Warner Bros. animated films
Japanese adult animated films
2000s American films